Thomas Foxcroft (1697–1769) was a minister of the First Church in Boston, Massachusetts in the  18th century.

Biography

Foxcroft was born on February 26, 1697, in Boston to "Colonel Francis Foxcroft, warden of King's Chapel" and "Elizabeth Danforth, daughter of Governor Danforth."  He was educated at Harvard.

He joined the ministry of Boston's First Church in 1717 and remained there for the remainder of his career. "In 1736 Mr. Foxcroft was attacked by paralysis, which left him in an enfeebled condition. He continued to preach until the day of his death, but by no means as effectively as before his illness."

He died in Boston on June 18, 1769. His children included Samuel Foxcroft (died 1807).

References

Further reading

Works by Foxcroft

 A Discourse Concerning Kindness. Being a Sermon Preach'd in Boston, On the Lord's Day, Febr. 28th. 1719, 20. And now Published, with some Enlargement, at the Importunity of Many that Heard it.
 The character of Anna, the prophetess, consider'd and apply'd. In a sermon preach'd after the funeral of that honourable and devout gentlewoman, Dame Bridget Usher; who deceas'd at Boston, N.E. May 25. 1723. Being a widow of a great age. 1723.
 God the judge, putting down one, and setting up another. A sermon upon occasion of the death of our late sovereign lord King George, and the accession of His present Majesty, King George II to the British throne. 1727.
 The voice of the Lord, from the deep places of the earth. A sermon preach'd on the Thursday-lecture in Boston, in the audience of the General Court, at the opening of the sessions, Nov. 23. 1727. Three weeks after the earthquake. 1727.
 A brief display of Mordecai's excellent character. In a sermon preach'd on the Lord's-Day after the funeral of the Honorable Penn Townsend, Esq; one of His Majesty's Council for the province of the Massachusetts-Bay, &c. Who departed this life, Aug. 21. 1727. In the 76th year of his age. 1727.
 Observations historical and practical on the rise and primitive state of New-England : with a special reference to the Old or First Gather'd Church in Boston : a sermon preach'd to the said congregation, Aug. 23, 1730, being the last Sabbath of the first century since its settlement. 1730.
 Lessons of caution to young sinners. A sermon preach'd on Lord's-Day Sept. 23. 1733. Upon the affecting occasion of an unhappy young woman [i.e., Rebekah Chamblit] present in the assembly under sentence of death. 1733.
 Elisha lamenting after the God of Elijah. A funeral sermon preach'd at Boston, March 27. 1737. Occasion'd by the death of the Reverend Mr. Benjamin Wadsworth, late president of Harvard-College in Cambridge, and formerly Pastor of the Old Church in Boston. Who departed this life on March 16. Having just enter'd the 68th year of his age. 1737.
 The earthquake, a divine visitation. A sermon preached to the Old Church in Boston, January 8. 1756. Being a day of publick humiliation and prayer, throughout the province of Massachusetts-Bay in New-England: upon occasion of the repeated shock of an earthquake on this continent, and the very destructive earthquakes and inundations in divers parts of Europe, all in the month of November last. 1756.
 Grateful reflexions on the signal appearances of divine providence for Great Britain and its colonies in America, which diffuse a general joy. A sermon preached in the Old Church in Boston, October 9. 1760. Being the thanksgiving-day, on occasion of the surrender of Montreal, and the complete conquest of Canada, by the blessing of heaven on his Britannic Majesty's brave troops, under the auspicious conduct of that truly great and amiable commander, General Amherst. 1760.

Works about Foxcroft
 Charles Chauncy. A discourse occasioned by the death of the Reverend Thomas Foxcroft, M.A: late Colleague-Pastor of the First Church of Christ in Boston: who departed this life on Lord’s-Day forenoon, June 18. 1769. In the 73d year of his age. Delivered the Lord’s-Day after his decease. Boston: Printed by Daniel Kneeland, at his printing-office, in Hanover-Street, for Thomas Leverett, in Corn-Hill, 1769.
 William Allen. "Thomas Foxcroft." An American biographical and historical dictionary, 2nd ed.  W. Hyde & Co., 1832.
 A. B. Ellis. History of the First Church in Boston, 1630–1880. Boston: Hall & Whiting, 1881.

External links

 WorldCat
 Princeton University. Thomas Foxcroft Correspondence, 1729–1759.
 Boston University. Foxcroft Papers (1690–1770).

1697 births
Clergy from Boston
American Christian clergy
18th-century Christian clergy
1769 deaths
18th century in Boston
Harvard University alumni
18th-century American clergy